St. Croix Cove is a community in the Canadian province of Nova Scotia, located in Annapolis County. It is named for Captain St. Croix who settled here c.1772.

References

Communities in Annapolis County, Nova Scotia